T20 may refer to:

Aircraft 
 AeroVironment T-20, a French UAV
 Slingsby T.20, a British glider

Automobiles 
 Chana Shenqi T20, a kei truck
 Cooper T20, a racing car
 Jinbei Haixing T20, a pickup truck
 Suzuki T20, a motorcycle
 Toyota Corona (T20), a sedan

Rail and transit 
 Prussian T 20, a steam locomotive
 Akaike Station (Aichi), Nisshin, Aichi, Japan
 Higashi-Umeda Station, Umeda, Kita-ku, Osaka, Japan
 Gyōtoku Station, Ichikawa, Chiba, Japan
 Sanuki-Mure Station, Takamatsu, Kagawa, Japan

Sport 
 T20 (classification), a disability athletics classification
 Twenty20, a form of cricket

Other uses 
 Enfuvirtide, an HIV drug
 
 IBM ThinkPad T20 series of notebook computers
 T-20 armored tractor Komsomolets, a Soviet artillery tractor
 T20 Medium Tank, an American tank
 T20 summit, a series of international summit for think tanks from the G-20 countries